Witness is a 1988 Malayalam investigative thriller made in India, directed by Viji Thampi and co-written by Jagathy Sreekumar, starring Jayaram, Jagathy Sreekumar, Parvathy, Madhu and Sukumaran in the lead roles.

Plot

Balagopalan arrives in Thiruvananthapuram with 12500 rupees stolen from his father. He finds his friend Jayakumar who is working as a junior artist in films. After losing the money, they start an evening food stall. Rivalry with another stall leads them to Police station where they acquaint with advocate Madhavan.

Under the guidance of Madhavan Thampi, the friends start a call service called "We Help" to help people. Balu gets a call from Indu R. Nair, who is the daughter of a businessman. Later, Indu asks Balagopalan to be her bodyguard. But when Jayakumar and Balagopalan visit her home, they discover that Indu has been murdered. Police Officer Thomas Mathew takes charge of the case. Madhavan tries to find her killer to save Balagopalan and Jayakumar, before it is too late.

Police officer Thomas Mathew initially arrests Balu and Kumar based on circumstantial evidence since they were found at Indu's House after her murder. However, Madhavan Thampi bails them out while further investigation proceeds. Thomas Mathew suspects Indu's Uncle Rajagopalan Nair to be the culprit since he was Indu's caretaker after her parents were killed in an accident years ago and the two had a falling out earlier when Indu decided to manage her wealth on her own. He also questions Alex Williams, Indu's college mate who had a history of harassing her before. Meanwhile, Balu and Kumar try to find some evidence to find the real murderer. They break into Indu's flat and find a sketch made by her, probably of her murderers. Madhavan Thampi takes the sketch to Thomas Mathew who runs it against the list of available habitual criminals. They find the picture matching with Hamsa and his accomplice, both of whom are professional killers imprisoned currently under another case. Since they were already arrested at the time of crime, Thomas Mathew dismisses the sketch as a false lead and decides to arrest Balu and Kumar. Meanwhile, Madhavan Thampi investigates of his own to find the real murderers also.

Finally at the court during the cases’ hearing, he divulges before the court that the actual killer is none other than CI Thomas Mathew himself. Thomas was transferred to this police station from his earlier place as punishment transfer to the suspected lock-up murder of a lower caste activist. He learns that CI Alexander who is investigating that case is all set to implicate Thomas on the case and tries to influence him. When Alexander relents to let go off the case, Thomas Mathew decides to finish him off. He hires Hamsa and his accomplice who murder police officer Alexander on a rainy night. Unfortunately, this murder was witnessed by Indu who was on her way back from in the night after her tour with friends. Frightened at witnessing the murder, she informs the local police station of the incident, but unfortunately the call is attended by Thomas Mathew himself who had framed a fake case and put Hamsa and his accomplice behind bars as an alibi to cover up the murder. He visits Indu's apartment next day early morning and murders Indu. Madhavan Thampi proves this with the help of the apartment watcher who had seen Thomas Mathew and the bartender who has overheard Thomas Mathew trying to influence Alexander at the police club. Thomas Mathew finally confesses at the court and Balu and Kumar are acquitted.

Cast

Soundtrack
The music was composed by Ouseppachan and the lyrics were written by Bichu Thirumala.

Box office
The film was declared a hit at the box office.

Remake
The film was remade in Telugu as Sakshi with Rajendra Prasad.

References

External links
 

1980s Malayalam-language films
Indian mystery thriller films
1988 films
1980s mystery thriller films
Malayalam films remade in other languages
Fictional portrayals of the Kerala Police
Films shot in Thiruvananthapuram
Films directed by Viji Thampi
Films scored by Ouseppachan